Ichthyochytrium is a fungal genus in the Chytridiales of uncertain familial placement. A monotypic genus, it contains the single rare species Ichthyochytrium vulgare, described from Germany by Marianne Plehn in 1920. A parasite of freshwater fishes, it forms spherical bodies measuring 5–20 µm that have refractive granules. It typically attacks the lung and gills.

References

External links

Chytridiomycota genera
Monotypic fungi genera